Charles Oliver (1646 – 13 April 1706) was an Irish landowner.

The son of Captain Robert Oliver (died 1679) ("Robin Rhu") of Castle Oliver, Oliver was Sheriff of County Limerick in 1692, Sheriff of County Cork in 1695, Member of Parliament for Midleton from 1695 to 1699, Deputy Governor of County Limerick in 1699 and Member of Parliament for County Limerick from 1703 until his death.

He was married to Elizabeth, daughter of Sir Percy Smyth of County Waterford. They had a son, Robert Oliver (died 1739), and four daughters, who married into Cork and Limerick families.

References

1646 births
1706 deaths
Alumni of Trinity College Dublin
High Sheriffs of County Limerick
High Sheriffs of County Cork
Irish MPs 1695–1699
Members of the Parliament of Ireland (pre-1801) for County Cork constituencies
Irish MPs 1703–1713
Members of the Parliament of Ireland (pre-1801) for County Limerick constituencies